Jimmy Boyd was a two-term Democratic member of the Louisiana House of Representatives from Bossier City in northwestern Louisiana. He represented Bossier Parish from 1944 to 1952, sandwiched between the tenure of long-term Representative Ford E. Stinson of Benton.

References

 

Democratic Party members of the Louisiana House of Representatives
People from Bossier City, Louisiana
Year of birth missing
Year of death missing